When the Cat Is Away is a 1962 Greek comedy film made by Finos Films.  It was directed by Alekos Sakellarios and stars Vasilis Avlonitis, Rena Vlachopoulou and Niki Linardou.

Plot
Rena Vlachopoulou played as a member that exploited her absence of her former that attended her girl's.  The movie made success with the song "As paei ke to paliambelo" (Ας πάει και το παλιάμπελο) (with Giorgos Mouzakis, Alekos Sakellarios and Christos Giannakopoulos).

Cast 
Rena Vlahopoulou ..... Marigo
Vasilis Avlonitis ..... Loukas
Andreas Douzos ..... Angelos Floras
Niki Linardou ..... Elli
Floreta Zana ..... Anna Zemberi
Giorgos Gavriilidis ..... Mr. Zemberis
Giannis Vogiatzis ..... Telis Stefanis
Nikos Rizos ..... Babis
Stavros Paravas ..... band member
Marika Krevata ..... Mrs. Zemberi
Giorgos Xydis ..... club doorman

Info

Montage: Gerasimos Papadaros
Stylist: Petros Kapouralis
Make-up: Varvara Nikolettou
Photographer Member: Lefteris Vlachos
Tickets: 31,133

External links

1962 films
Greek comedy films
1960s Greek-language films
Finos Film films